Theodor Berthels (born Bertil Teodor Jonsson; 16 June 1892 – 21 October 1951) was a Swedish actor, screenwriter and film director.

Selected filmography
 The Secret of the Duchess (1923)
 Flickan från Paradiset (1924)
 The People of Simlang Valley (1924)
The Poetry of Ådalen (1928)
 The People of Norrland (1930)
 A Night of Love by the Öresund (1931)
 Jolly Musicians (1932)
 Kanske en gentleman (1935)
 Kungen kommer (1936)
 Adolf Strongarm (1937)
 Sun Over Sweden (1938)
 Kalle's Inn (1939)
 A Sailor on Horseback (1940)
 Bashful Anton (1940)
 Blossom Time (1940)
 Fransson the Terrible (1941)
 Livet måste levas (1943)
 In Darkest Smaland (1943)
 Blizzard (1944)
 Kristin Commands (1946)
 Loffe the Tramp (1948)
 Son of the Sea (1949)
 Åsa-Nisse (1949)
Åsa-Nisse Goes Hunting (1950)
 Perhaps a Gentleman (1950)

References

Bibliography
 Qvist, Per Olov & von Bagh, Peter. Guide to the Cinema of Sweden and Finland. Greenwood Publishing Group, 2000.

External links
 

1892 births
1951 deaths
Swedish male stage actors
Swedish male film actors
Swedish male silent film actors
Swedish film directors
Swedish male screenwriters
20th-century Swedish male actors
People from Norrköping